Begmanji railway station is  located in Begmanji village, Sukkur district of Sindh province of the Pakistan.

See also
 List of railway stations in Pakistan
 Pakistan Railways

References

External links

Railway stations in Sukkur District
Sukkur District
Railway stations on Karachi–Peshawar Line (ML 1)